King of the herrings is a common name for several fishes and may refer to:

Regalecus glesne
Trachipterus arcticus